2022 best actor 2022 best of nollyhood awards
Adetola Abdullateef Adedimeji  (born 1 February 1984) is a Nigerian actor and filmmaker. He gained popularity with his first major role in Yewande Adekoya's 2013 movie titled Kudi Klepto and has acted in over 100 Nigerian movies since he began acting 15 years ago. He is currently a brand ambassador for Airtel and Numatville Megacity.

Early life 
Lateef Adedimeji was born on the 1 February 1984 in Isolo, Lagos State, southwestern Nigeria. He is a native of Abeokuta, Ogun State.

Education 
Lateef started his primary education at Ire Akari Primary School, Isolo, Lagos State, and went to Ilamoye Grammar School Okota Lagos for his secondary school education. He also attended a performance studio workshop at Onikan Lagos State where he had his performance training. His writing and acting skill were also developed in a Non governmental organization (NGO)  (Community Life Project). He graduated from Olabisi Onabanjo University, where he obtained a bachelor's degree in Mass Communication.

Career 
Lateef Adedimeji began his acting career in 2007, started his career with dancing, and was enrolled in a dancing school. Lateef Adedimeji is an Actor and Screenwriter. Lateef Adedimeji has featured in various stage roles since when he was 15 but he started acting in 2007 when he joined Orisun TV. He started acting while in secondary school and he was picked by an NGO to serve as an informer and counselor during an HIV/AIDS campaign. His role was to educate the general public on sexual-related issues and human rights by creating video content in which he acted. Fans know him for playing the role of an emotional character that cries often. He has starred in several Nigerian films over the years alongside major names in the movie industry. In 2016, he won 2016 Best of Nollywood Awards for Best Actor in a Lead Role (Yoruba). In 2015, he was nominated for City People Entertainment Awards for the 2015 Most Promising Actor of the year. Lateef is widely confused to be related to popular Nigerian actor Odunlade Adekola due to their uncanny resemblance and sense of humor. He was equally opportune to work with UNICEF due to his writing prowess. He was awarded the face of Nollywood male during the ENigeria Newspaper Night of Honour on 30 October 2021.

Personal life
On 18 December 2021, Adedimeji wedded his partner, who is also an actress, Oyebade Adebimpe in colorful style.

Filmography 
Kudi Klepto  (2015)
Yeye Oge (2016)
Once Upon a Time (2017)
Ilu Ominira (2018)
Bipolar (Àmódí) (2018)
Bina Baku (2019)
Depth (2019)
Koto (2019)
Igi Aladi (2019)
Adebimpe Omooba (2019)
The New Patriots (2020)
Veil (2020)
Breaded Life (2021)
Dwindle (2021)
Ayinla (2021)
Progressive Tailors Club (2021)
Love Castle (2021)
A Naija Christmas (2021)
King of Thieves (2022 film) (2022)
Strangers (2022)
Ile Alayo (2022)

Awards and honors

See also 
List of Yoruba people

References 

Living people
1986 births
Nigerian male film actors
Male actors from Abeokuta
Male actors in Yoruba cinema
Yoruba male actors
21st-century Nigerian male actors
Olabisi Onabanjo University alumni
Yoruba filmmakers
Yoruba-language film directors
Entertainers from Ogun State
Nigerian film producers
Nigerian media personalities